Wide Sargasso Sea is a British television adaptation of Jean Rhys's 1966 novel of the same name.

Produced by Kudos Film & Television for BBC Wales, the one-off 90-minute drama was first broadcast on digital television channel BBC Four on 9 October 2006. It was repeated on BBC One on Sunday, 22 October 2006, the week following the conclusion of BBC One's adaptation of Jane Eyre, to which Wide Sargasso Sea is a prequel.

The adaptation was scripted by playwright Stephen Greenhorn, produced by Elwen Rowlands and directed by Brendan Maher. It starred Rebecca Hall as Antoinette Cosway and Rafe Spall as Rochester.

Plot summary

Cast
Rafe Spall as Edward Rochester
Rebecca Hall as Antoinette Cosway
Nina Sosanya as Christophine
Victoria Hamilton as Aunt Cora
Fraser Ayres as Daniel
Lorraine Burroughs as Amelie
Alex Robertson as Richard Mason
Karen Meagher as Grace Poole

See also
Wide Sargasso Sea (1993 film)

References

External links
Wide Sargasso Sea at bbc.co.uk
 
 
 Review at JaneEyre.net

British television films
BBC television dramas
Television shows based on British novels
Films set in Jamaica
Works based on Jane Eyre